Peter Harder may refer to:
Peter Harder (politician) (born 1952), Canadian Senator and former civil servant
Peter Harder (academic) (born 1950), linguist and professor of English at the University of Copenhagen